Tionette Stoddard aka T-Dog (born 24 September 1974 in Queensland, Australia) is a New Zealand skeleton racer who has competed since 2004. Her best Skeleton World Cup finish was seventh at St. Moritz in January 2008.

Stoddard's best finish at the FIBT World Championships was 12th in the women's event at Lake Placid in 2009.

She qualified for the 2010 Winter Olympics where she finished 14th.

References

External links

1974 births
Living people
New Zealand female skeleton racers
Olympic skeleton racers of New Zealand
Skeleton racers at the 2010 Winter Olympics